Mahesh Bhupathi Tennis Academy is a tennis training facility started by Indian tennis player Mahesh Bhupathi. The Academy has facilities across 9 states in India as well as in the UAE.

References 

Tennis in India
Sport schools in India
Sport in Pune
Sports venues in Pune
2013 establishments in Maharashtra
Sports venues completed in 2013
Educational institutions established in 2013